Dauis, officially the Municipality of Dauis,  is now a 2nd class municipality in the province of Bohol, Philippines. According to the 2020 census, it has a population of 52,492 people. The town has many fine beaches, resorts, and a historic church, built in the 17th century. The Hinagdanan Cave is also a draw for tourists.

History

Dauis is one of the oldest municipalities of Bohol, as attested by the discovery of early Chinese artifacts in the 1970s. All records of the town were destroyed in World War Two, however church records show the parish was established in 1697. The stone watchtower, now only ruins, was built in 1774. 

The first bridge between Poblacion of Dauis and Mansasa, Tagbilaran, was constructed by Spaniards during their reign, possibly in the 18th century. The bridge is still in place, used as a connection between the two islands. The other bridge was constructed near the old City Hall of Tagbilaran City, crossing towards Totolan.

A deep well was constructed in Poblacion in 1900 by a Spanish leader where the well is now located, inside the Church below the altar. The locals provided the labor. The well was constructed through manual digging using bolos, crowbars, pulleys, and rope for digging into the soil stones, which contains limestone rock.

Geography
Dauis is located in the northern part of Panglao Island.

Barangays
Dauis comprises 12 barangays:

Climate

Demographics

Economy

Culture

The town's 18th-century church, is dedicated to La Señora de la Asuncion or Our Lady of the Assumption. The church is believed to have been built of light materials by the first Spanish missionaries in 1697. Since then, the church has gone through several changes.

The image of the La Señora de la Asuncion is famed to be miraculous. Faithfuls come from near and far to hike the distance from the city to the site to invoke special petitions or mainly to honor the Patroness. In addition, at the foot of the altar of the church is a well also believed to have healing power. The water tastes fresh, despite the well's proximity to the seashore.

15 August
The town and all devotees of the La Señora de la Asuncion attend the Patroness' feast day every 15 August. Stories abound of the Patroness' sojourn and blessings. One of the stories tells of a man who found a camiseta (blouse) in his fishing boat after a lady passenger disembarked. On several occasions, devotees found the Patroness' camiseta full of amorseco. Many believe the Patroness must, on occasions, get down from her pedestal to visit them in their homes and farms. To this day, devotees continue to venerate and pay homage as manifestation of gratitude and appreciation after being healed of their ailments through the camiseta.
Last Sunday of January
Another fiesta is celebrated last Sunday of January, to commemorate a miracle that happened many years back. It is said that many young girls have seen the lady waving her hands as if bidding them to come near.

Tourism

Dauis's major tourist attractions are Our Lady of Assumption Church and Hinagdanan Cave.  Our Lady of Assumption Church is locally known as Señora de la Asunción.  The church was built by Boholanos under forced labor imposed by the Spanish. It is constructed of solid rocks or stones and has paintings on the walls.  There is a tower with a bell, outside the church another tower and also a small well.  The front face of the church collapsed during the earthquake of 2013.

Gallery

References

External links

 [ Philippine Standard Geographic Code]
Dauis, Bohol

Municipalities of Bohol